Arntz may refer to:

People
 Gerd Arntz, German artist
 Peter Arntz, Dutch footballer
 William Arntz, American director

Places